Vincent Justus Burnelli (November 22, 1895 – June 22, 1964) was an American aeronautics engineer, instrumental in furthering the lifting body and flying wing concept.

Biography
Burnelli was born on November 22, 1895, in Temple, Texas.

With his friend, John Carisi, he designed his first airplane in 1915, at Maspeth, Queens, New York. The open biplane was first demonstrated at the old Hempstead Plains Aviation Field, later to become Roosevelt Field. A few years later, he designed a "night fighter" in the hopes that it would be used as a combat aircraft in World War I. His hopes were not realized, but he did sell the plane to the New York City Police Department, when plans were made to create an aerial police operation.

In 1919, Burnelli refined his ideas about aircraft design, after he had built what is believed to have been the world's first large commercial airliner, the Lawson L-4, in Milwaukee, Wisconsin, for the Lawson Airlines.

Flying wing/lifting body

Burnelli was one of the first American designers to capitalize on the "flying wing" mystique. In the 1920s, he produced two biplane transports with large, airfoil-shaped fuselages that contributed a considerable portion of the airplane's lift. His goal was to develop a more efficient airplane that could carry a large payload. Although Burnelli referred to his lifting body transports as "flying wings", his production aircraft invariably retained some kind of a tail, frequently supported by upswept booms that extended rearward. More accurately, Burnelli had a "lifting body" design, rather than a true "flying wing" where all major aeronautical components are housed within the wing.

Burnelli's first monoplane, the CB-16, appeared in 1928. This aircraft and subsequent Burnelli types produced into the 1940s had certain features in common: 
 The engines were close together and ahead of the cabin structure
 The airfoil fuselage section, which provided 50 percent lift at cruising speed, housed the passenger cabin and the pilot's and mechanic's compartments.

More than 60 percent of the weight and strength of the aircraft structure surrounded and protected the passenger cabin section for maximum resistance to telescoping.

Burnelli maintained that his lifting design had unparalleled safety, economic and operational advantages over conventional transport designs. His design philosophy was supported by many prominent civil and military aviation experts well into the late 1940s, but he failed to gain the political and economic backing that would have ensured public acceptance of his unconventional designs. Through various partnerships, he worked for and created a diverse number of companies that would produce his designs, most of which saw the light as experimental or prototype aircraft. The elusive production contracts that he so wanted, continued to elude him. His last design, the CBY-3 Loadmaster, was manufactured by Canada Car and Foundry in Montreal. The sole prototype was extensively tested but failed to gain a production contract.

Later years
Moving to Southampton, New York, Burnelli remained tireless in his determination to promote his airfoil-shaped fuselage transport planes. In 1955, he adapted his final design, the Burnelli CBY-3 Loadmaster, to carry an expedition of 20 passengers and 41 sled dogs, along with their equipment, to the North Pole, but the enterprise was canceled. Until his death in 1964 at the age of 68, Vincent Burnelli championed his "flying wing" designs.

Legacy
The Loadmaster continued to fly regularly as a commercial airliner both in northern Canada and South America. Acquired with design rights by Airlifts, Inc. of Miami, Florida, it went to Venezuela and returned to Burnelli Avionics for refitting with Wright R-2600 engines. The CBY-3 finally ended its flying days at Baltimore's airport in Maryland. In 1964, the quintessential Burnelli "flying wing" air transport was retired to the New England Air Museum in Windsor Locks, Connecticut, where it remains.

Burnelli designs
 Continental KB-1 (1915)
 Burnelli  (Lawson Airlines)
 Remington-Burnelli (airliner) SEE Burnelli, wide, airfoil-shaped fuselage w 2 Liberty 12 (400 hp) engines, 78' span;, 22.25' lg
 Burnelli RB-1 (1921)
 Burnelli RB-2 Air freighter (1924)
 Burnelli CB-16 Chapman Airliner (1928)
 Burnelli UB-20 (1929)
 Burnelli GX-3 (1929)
 Uppercu-Burnelli Aeromarine-Klemm Amphibian seaplane (1930)
 Burnelli UB-14 (1935)
 Cunliffe-Owen Aircraft OA-1 Clyde Clipper (licence-built British version of the UB-14) (1939)
 Burnelli XCG-16 cargo glider (1943)
 Burnelli CBY-3 Loadmaster (1944) built in Canada by Canadian Car and Foundry

References

External links 
 Extensive story of Burnelli's designs
 The Burnelli Controversy – Air & Space Magazine

Members of the Early Birds of Aviation
Saint Peter's University alumni
1895 births
1964 deaths
People from Temple, Texas
People from Suffolk County, New York